Asavela Shakespeare Mbekile (born 1 November 1986) is a South African former footballer who played as a central midfielder.

Career
Born in Cape Town, Mbekile has played club football for Ikapa Sporting, FC Cape Town, Chippa United, Moroka Swallows, Mamelodi Sundowns, Orlando Pirates and Stellenbosch.

He made his international debut for South Africa in 2014.

References

1986 births
Living people
South African soccer players
South Africa international soccer players
Ikapa Sporting F.C. players
F.C. Cape Town players
Chippa United F.C. players
Moroka Swallows F.C. players
Mamelodi Sundowns F.C. players
Orlando Pirates F.C. players
South African Premier Division players
Association football midfielders
Stellenbosch F.C. players
South Africa A' international soccer players
2014 African Nations Championship players